Miscellany is an extended play by Russian progressive chamber band iamthemorning. It was self-released on 1 January 2014. The album was mixed by Marcel van Limbeek, Gianluca Capacchione and Mark Knight then mastered by Marcel van Limbeek at Reveal Sound in London.

Reception
Emma Johnston of Team Rock gave a mixed review describing comparisons to Tori Amos as “blindingly inevitable” while calling Semkina’s voice “clear, thrilling [and] theatrical”.

Track listing

Personnel
iamthemorning
 Gleb Kolyadin – grand piano, keyboards 
 Marjana Semkina – vocals, backing vocals

Additional musicians
 Gavin Harrison — drums on “The Simple Story”
 Vlad Avy - guitars and sampled percussion on “The Simple Story”
 Max Roudenko — bass on “The Simple Story”

Production
 Marcel van Limbeek – engineering, mastering, mixing
 Gianluca Capacchione – engineering, mixing
 Drew Smith – engineering
 Anna Pavluk – engineering
 Mark Knight – engineering, mixing
 KJ Thorarinsson – engineering
 Nikita Valamin — engineering
 Constantine Nagishkin — artwork, cover design
 Max Roudenko — engineering

Strings Ensemble
"To Human Misery" and "The Simple Story" performedby Turner Quartet: 
 Robert Yeomans — first violin
 Ruth Funnell — second violin
 Holly Rouse  — viola
 Rosie Banks-Francis — cello
 Gleb Kolyadin — strings arrangement for “The Simple Story
 Grigory Losenkov — strings arrangement for The Human Misery

Touching (London Mix): 
 Ilya Dyakov — violin
 Philipp Buin — viola
 Alina Shilova — cello

Intermission VIII: 
Vsevolod Dolganov — cello

References

2014 EPs
Iamthemorning albums
Self-released EPs